Yu Yuet (born 16 March 1976) is a former Hong Kong diver. He competed in men's 3 metre springboard at the 2000 Summer Olympics, finishing 48th.

Reference

Hong Kong male divers
Divers at the 2000 Summer Olympics
1976 births
Living people
Olympic divers of Hong Kong